Margaret Ebunoluwa Aderin-Pocock  (born 9 March 1968) is a British space scientist and science educator. She is an honorary research associate of University College London's Department of Physics and Astronomy, and has been the chancellor of the University of Leicester since February 2023. Since February 2014, she has co-presented the long-running astronomy television programme The Sky at Night with Chris Lintott. In 2020 she was awarded the Institute of Physics William Thomson, Lord Kelvin Medal and Prize for her public engagement in physics. She is the first black woman to win a gold medal in the Physics News Award and she served as the president of the British Science Association from 2021 to 2022.

Early life and education 
Margaret Ebunoluwa Aderin was born in London on 9 March 1968 to Nigerian parents, Caroline Philips and Justus Adebayo Aderin, and was raised in Camden, London. Her middle name Ebunoluwa comes from the Yoruba words "ebun" meaning "gift" and Oluwa meaning "God", which is also a variant form of the word "Oluwabunmi" or "Olubunmi", meaning "gift of God" in Yoruba. She attended La Sainte Union Convent School in North London. She is dyslexic. As a child, when she told a teacher she wanted to be an astronaut, it was suggested she try nursing, "because that's scientific, too". She gained A-Levels in maths, physics, chemistry, and biology.

She studied at Imperial College London, graduated with a BSc in physics in 1990, and completed her PhD in mechanical engineering under the supervision of Hugh Spikes in 1994. Her research investigated the development of an ultra-thin film measurement system using spectroscopy and interferometry to the 2.5 nm level. This involved improving the optical performance and the mechanical design of the system, as well as the development of control and image processing software. Other techniques at the time could only operate to the micron level with much poorer resolution. This development work resulted in the instrument being sold by an Imperial College University spin-off company, PCS Instruments.

Career and research 
Aderin-Pocock has worked on many projects in private industry, academia, and government. From 1996 to 1999 she worked at the Defence Evaluation and Research Agency, a branch of the UK Ministry of Defence. Initially she was a systems scientist on aircraft missile warning systems; from 1997 to 1999, she was a project manager developing hand-held instruments to detect landmines. In 1999, Aderin-Pocock returned to Imperial College on a fellowship from the Science and Technology Facilities Council to work with the group developing a high-resolution spectrograph for the Gemini telescope in Chile. The high spectral resolution of the instrument allowed studies of stellar populations, interstellar medium, and some physical phenomena in stars with small masses.

She is working on and managing the observation instruments for the Aeolus satellite, which will measure wind speeds to help the investigation of climate change. She is a pioneering figure in communicating science to the public, specifically school children. Her company, Science Innovation Ltd, engages children and adults through its "Tours of the Universe" a programme that explains about the science of space.

Aderin-Pocock is committed to inspiring new generations of astronauts, engineers, and scientists. She has spoken to approximately 25,000 children, many from inner-city schools, explaining how and why she became a scientist, challenging perceptions about careers, class, and gender. She helps encourage scientific endeavours of young people by being a judge at the National Science + Engineering Competition. The finals of this competition are held at The Big Bang Fair in March each year, and reward young people who have achieved excellence in a science, technology, engineering, or mathematics project.

Aderin-Pocock was the scientific consultant for the 2009 mini-series Paradox, and also appeared on Doctor Who Confidential. In February 2011 she presented Do We Really Need the Moon? on BBC Two. She presented In Orbit: How Satellites Rule Our World on BBC Two on 26 March 2012.

As well as presenting The Sky at Night with Chris Lintott, Aderin-Pocock has presented Stargazing on CBeebies with Chris Jarvis, and Out of This World on CBBC with her daughter Lauren. She has also appeared on Would I Lie to You?, Dara O Briain's Go 8 Bit, Richard Osman's House of Games, and QI.

Since 2006, Aderin-Pocock has served as a research fellow at UCL Department of Science and Technology Studies, supported by a Science in Society fellowship 2010–2013 funded by Science and Technology Facilities Council (STFC). She previously held two other fellowships related to science communication, including science and society fellowships 2006–08 Particle Physics and Astronomy Research Council (PPARC) and 2008–10 (STFC). In  2006, she was one of six "Women of Outstanding Achievement" winners with GetSET Women.

In 2014, the pseudonymously written Ephraim Hardcastle diary column in the Daily Mail claimed that Aderin-Pocock (along with Hiranya Peiris) had been selected to discuss results from the Background Imaging of Cosmic Extragalactic Polarization 2 (BICEP-2) experiment on Newsnight because of her gender and ethnicity. The comments were condemned by mainstream media, the Royal Astronomical Society and Aderin-Pocock and Pereis's university, University College London. The Daily Mail withdrew its claim within days, acknowledging that the women were chosen because they are highly qualified in their fields.

She is an honorary research associate of University College London's Department of Physics and Astronomy.

In 2020–21 she served as a commissioner on the UK Government's Commission on Race and Ethnic Disparities (CRED). The Commission's controversial report concluded that the "claim the country is still institutionally racist is not borne out by the evidence", but experts complained that the report misrepresented evidence, and that recommendations from business leaders were ignored. After the report was published, Aderin-Pocock stated that it "was not denying institutional racism existed but said the commission had not discovered evidence of it in the areas it had looked".

Since December 2021, Aderin-Pocock has been a question-setter for the Channel 4 game show I Literally Just Told You.

Awards and honours 
Aderin-Pocock was appointed a Member of the Order of the British Empire in the 2009 New Year Honours for services to science education. She also was awarded an honorary doctorate from Staffordshire University in 2009 for contributions to the field of science education.
 2005 – Awarded "Certificate of Excellence" by the Champions Club UK
 2011 – Winner of the "New Talent" award from the WFTV (Women in Film and Television)
 2012 – UK Powerlist, listed as one of the UK top 100 most influential black people
 2013 – UK Power List, listed as one of the UK top 10 most influential black people
 2013 – Yale University Centre for Dyslexia "Out of the box thinking award"
 2014 – Honorary Doctor of Science, University of Bath
 2016 – Powerlist Ranked sixth most influential Black Briton
 2017 – Honorary Doctor of Science, Loughborough University
 2018 – Honorary Doctor of Science, University of Leicester
 2020 – Institute of Physics William Thomson, Lord Kelvin Medal and Prize for her public engagement in physics

In 2023, Mattel created a Barbie doll of Aderin-Pocock to celebrate International Women's Day.

Personal life 
Aderin-Pocock discussed her life on BBC Radio 4's Desert Island Discs in March 2010, and has been the subject of numerous biographical articles on women in science.

She married Martin Pocock in 2002. They have one daughter, Lauren, born in 2010, and live in Guildford, Surrey.

Publications 
 Aderin-Pocock, Maggie. "Dr. Maggie's Grand Tour of the Solar System"  Publisher: Buster Books, Sept 2019,  
 Aderin-Pocock, Maggie. "The Knowledge: Stargazing"  Publisher: Quadrille Publishing Ltd, 10 September 2015, 
 Aderin, M. "Space Instrumentation: Physics and Astronomy in Harmony?" Paper presented at the Engineering and Physics – Synergy for Success, 5 October 2006, UK.
 
 Barlow, M. J., A. S. Hales, P. J. Storey, X. W. Liu, Y. G. Tsamis, and M. E. Aderin. "Bhros High Spectral Resolution Observations of Pn Forbidden and Recombination Line Profiles." Proceedings of the International Astronomical Union 2, no. Symposium S234 (2006): 367–68.
 Aderin, M. E. "Bhros Installation and System Performance." Paper presented at the Ground-based Instrumentation for Astronomy, 21–25 June 2004, USA.
 Aderin, M., I. Crawford, P. D'Arrigo, and A. Charalambous. "High Resolution Optical Spectrograph (Hros): A Summary of Progress." Paper presented at the Conference on Optical and IR Telescope Instrumentation and Detectors, 27–31 March 2000, Munich, Germany.
 Aderin, M. E., and I. A. Burch. "Countermine: Hand Held and Vehicle Mounted Mine Detection." Paper presented at the Second International Conference on Detection of Abandoned Land Mines, 12–14 October 1998, London, UK. 
 Aderin, Margaret Ebunoluwa. "Interferometric Studies of Very Thin Lubricant Films in Concentrated Contacts."
 
 
 Cann, P. M., M. Aderin, G. J. Johnston, and H. A. Spikes. "An Investigation into the Orientation Oflubricant Molecules in Ehd Contacts." In Wear Particles: From the Cradle to the Grave, edited by D. Dowson, G. Dalmaz, T. H. C. Childs, C. M. Taylor and M. Godet. 209–18: Elsevier Science Publishers, 1992.

References

External links 
 
 https://www.facebook.com/drmaggieaderinpocock
Academic webpage 

1968 births
Living people
Alumni of Imperial College London
British space scientists
Members of the Order of the British Empire
People from Islington (district)
People from Guildford
English people of Yoruba descent
Academics of University College London
Black British women academics
English women scientists
Scientists with dyslexia